= Kudalgi =

Coordinates: 17°05′N 76°31′E

- Village
- Interactive map of Kudalgi
- Country: India
- State: Karnataka
- District: Dharwad

Government
  - Type: Panchayat raj
  - Body: Village Panchayat

Population (2011)
  - Total: 1,142

Languages
  - Official: Kannada
- Time zone: UTC+5:30 (IST)
- ISO 3166 code: IN-KA
- Vehicle registration: KA
- Website: dharwad.nic.in

Kudalgi is a village in Dharwad district of Karnataka, India.

== Demographics ==
As of the 2011 Census of India there were 236 households in Kudalgi and a total population of 1,142 consisting of 591 males and 551 females. There were 128 children ages 0–6. The 2022-2023 population estimate is 1,279 - 1,393.
